Ernest C. Bairstow (1876–1962) was an English-born American architectural sculptor noted for work on buildings in Washington, D.C., including the Lincoln Memorial.

Career

Ernest C. Bairstow was born in England in 1876.

Bairstow assisted Adolfo De Nesti (1870-1935) of Florence with the statuary of the District (Wilson) Building in Washington DC, was constructed between 1902 and 1908.  Its allegorical attic figures represent Sculpture, Painting, Architecture, Music, Commerce, Engineering, Agriculture and Statesmanship.  The building is an excellent example of American Beaux Arts Classicism, and has been designated a Category II landmark of importance.

Around 1906, Bairstow created the Eagle lampposts at the Taft Bridge (Connecticut Avenue Bridge) in Washington.  The lamps were cast by the J. L. Motts Iron Works, New York. The lions were made by sculptor Roland Hinton Perry.

Bairstow created plaster composition figures of the muses that were installed in arches over boxes on each side of the stage of the Gayety Theater in Washington. The theater was completed in 1907, designed by architect William H. McElfatrick (1854-1922).  The theater originally was a member of the Columbia Circuit of Burlesque theaters.  After going through many changes, the theater was torn down in November 1959.

The United States General Services Administration Building, originally designed for the U.S. Department of the Interior, was built between 1915 and 1917. Bairstow carved the eagle over the central opening, designed the twenty-eight limestone panels in the frieze on the sixth story, and undertook the ornamental work on the F Street entrances.
In 1986 the building was listed in the National Register of Historic Places.

Bairstow carved the exterior decoration of the Lincoln Memorial and the inscriptions inside between 1914 and 1922.

Ernest C. Bairstow died in 1962.

Lincoln Memorial

The neoclassical Lincoln Memorial in Washington was designed by Henry Bacon,
Work started on 12 February 1914 and the work was dedicated on 30 May 1922.
Bairstow undertook the carvings on the exterior of the monument, including eagles, festoons, wreathes and the states.
Bairstow began to carve the friezes and inscriptions of the monument as soon as the stone of the upper parts of the monument was in place.
On the main frieze, he carved the names of the states and the wreathes in place. 
He probably roughed out the garlands and eagles of the attic frieze in the workshop.

Bairstow also carved the letters on the interior of the monument.  This included the text by Royal Cortissoz of the New York Herald Tribune which is carved above the large central statue by Daniel Chester French: "In this temple, as in the hearts of the people for whom he saved the Union, the memory of Abraham Lincoln is enshrined forever." 

Bairstow also carved the Gettysburg Address (1863) and Abraham Lincoln's second inaugural address (1865) on the walls on either side of the statue.

References

Sources

1876 births
1962 deaths
American architectural sculptors
English male sculptors
20th-century American sculptors
20th-century English male artists
20th-century American male artists
American male sculptors
British emigrants to the United States